William or Bill Longley may refer to:
 Bill Longley (gunfighter) (1851–1878), gunfighter and outlaw
 William Harding Longley (1881–1937), American botanist
 Bill Longley (speedway rider) (1911–2005), Australian motorcycle speedway rider